Sameer Siddiqui (born 4 September 1974 in Mumbai, India) is an Indian screenwriter and playwright.

His father is Javed Siddiqui, a Hindi and Urdu screenwriter, dialogue writer and playwright. He is also related to Mohammad Ali Jouhar and Maulana Shaukat Ali.

Films (Written)
’’The Sholay Girl’’ A Film for Zee 5 
Tum Milo Toh Sahi
Khanna & Iyer https://www.imdb.com/title/tt0982888/?ref_=fn_al_tt_1Main Madhuri Dixit Banna Chahti HoonTelevision (Written)Ishq Mein Marjawan 2 on Voot
’’Ishq Subhan Allah A Daily Soap on Zee TV 
’’Ishq Mein Marjawan A Daily Soap on Colours
Udaan - a daily soap on Colours
Cloud 9 - https://www.imdb.com/title/tt2583852/releaseinfo?ref_=tt_ov_inf   (125 episode screenplay)
Dhoom Machao Dhoom
Ayushmaan
CID
Gutur Gu a silent comedy

English to Hindi Translation
Bolt
Race to Witch Mountain

Theatre, Drama
Chiller Room - a play based on delinquent children
Dhakkan - a comic play based on two brothers who break away from their disciplined father but eventually realizing right from wrong, turn back to become just like their father

External links
 
 https://www.youtube.com/watch?v=R1pQSRQgrpk

1974 births
Living people
Indian Muslims
Indian male screenwriters
Indian television writers
Indian television directors
Screenwriters from Mumbai
Male television writers